Gorica Monastery is a Franciscan monastery in Gorica near Livno, Bosnia and Herzegovina.

References 

Livno
Roman Catholic Diocese of Banja Luka
History of Tropolje